Four Marks is a village and civil parish in the East Hampshire district of Hampshire, England. It is situated on the borders of the South Downs National Park on the Pilgrims' Way that leads from Winchester to Canterbury. It contains within it the medieval hamlets of Kitwood, Hawthorn and Lymington, although now the whole parish is relatively closely settled.

Etymology
First  mentioned within the c. 1550 Perambulation of the Manor of Alresford (a Perambulation being a detailed description of the boundaries of land) as  'Fowremarkes' . The relevant excerpt details;

 "a certain empty piece of land called Fowremarkes near Bookemere and named thus because four tithings abut there mutually, that is to say, the tithings of Medsted Ropley Faryngdon & Chawton". 

The 'Marks' element comes from Old English  'mark(e)'   meaning boundary, or border, so, Four Marks directly translates as Four Borders.

History

The modern village of Four Marks was founded at the end of the nineteenth century on little developed old commons and wastes mostly left from the 1709 Ropley enclosure. Four Marks became a parish in 1932 under Alton Rural District Council when parts of six parishes were annexed: Chawton (1%), East Tisted (2%), Farringdon (17%), Medstead (4%), Newton Valence (13%) and Ropley (64%). According to Bartholomew's Gazetteer, the village of Four Marks is the only so named place in the United Kingdom.

A pre-Roman ridgeway from the Old Sarum area, the Lunway, crosses through Four Marks from the north following the drier southern side of the ridge and is itself crossed near the old Windmill Inn (now the Co-op store) by a summerway from Alresford and its river following the quickest, driest, ‘up-and-over’ route to the River Wey. The area was given by King Cenwalh of the West Saxons to the bishopric at Winchester starting a chain of ecclesiastical management through to the current day. The commitment was confirmed in writing by a successor, King Ine, in A.D. 701 in a disputed charter. The charter listed many local gates and watering places, mostly identifiable today, showing that the area contained important Saxon husbandry.

As mentioned, Four Marks referred to the meeting point of four parishes, it was, therefore, not a place, but a four-way boundary point known as a quadripoint near the current Boundaries surgery (SU6715635272). It was marked by a ‘large white stone’ in 1759 which was reported destroyed by workmen during road construction in the 1960s. An old photograph notes its site tucked into a roadside hedge.

Apart from the accident of boundaries, 'Four Marks' for almost all its prehistory and most of its modern times was an empty, but busy, place. People passed through, or near by, without great notice using the Roman Road or King's Highway through Chawton Park Wood or, later, the Alton to Winchester turnpike (now the A31). The high point of the roads at about 215 metres was a chalk ridge, capped with clay and flints, lying between Telegraph Lane and the centre of Medstead. Rainwater flows to the north to the River Thames and, to the south, to The Solent. Under fifty inhabitants clustered away from the through road around small farms dotted along the old river bed called Lymington Bottom and, for instance, at Hawthorn, Kitfield and Kitwood. The area was not well known and did not feature in lists of hamlets in nineteenth or early twentieth century gazetteers. Around 1900, a few houses near the Windmill Inn took the name Four Marks. In 1897, there was a small post office near this point at Four Marks House.

The birth of the new village came in the years between 1894 and World War I. At least five major developers, one unidentified, descended on Four
Marks intent on social improvement or plain commercial gain. Winchester College Estate conducted at least two major sales: 350 acres in Medstead and Soldridge offered in April 1894 and, in May 1912, around the main road in Four Marks. The Land Company of London held two auctions at Lymington Park Estate in 1896 offering over 140 plots with a hotel and shops on a farm bought from Charles Frederick Hemming. Lymington Park Estate surrounded Lymington Farm, a substantial set of buildings on the corner of Brislands Lane, grandly renamed Lymington Park Road for the auction, and Lymington Bottom, called Medstead Main Road. At almost the same time, William Carter, owner of Herbert Park, offered large opportunities in Alton and Kitwood Lanes. A local man, Frank Gotelee, who in 1901 acquired much of the land in Medstead which had been accumulated in the 1850s and 60s by William Ivey, tried to sell freehold plots for development although with less success.

Carter's development was initially called The Homestead Movement. Its defining characteristics were cheap, rural or semirural land suitable for market gardening or self-sufficiency, and the option of a basic house, usually single-storey ‘colonial’ style bungalows in a ‘do-it-yourself’ community. ‘Colonial’ was a trade name with the several standard designs, mostly one, two or three bedrooms with a living room and kitchen costing from £100 upwards. The higher prices also brought tile roofs instead of corrugated iron. Homestead’s developments were sold without utilities: no clean water (use of a water tank or a well to be dug), no electricity (generator, solid fuel stoves and fireplaces, kerosene or gas lamps) and no sewerage (outside earth closet toilet).

In the ten years to 1901, the settlement around Four Marks doubled: inhabitants to 279 and dwellings to sixty-seven, and by 1911, a further increase to 334 people and to eighty-seven homes. Three maps of the sales survive for Winchester College, The Land Company and for Carter’s Herbert Park. Together, they contain 242 plots comprising an estimated 251 acres, about half the total acreage enclosed in the 1709 Ropley enclosure and on approximately the same land. The maps also cover almost every nook and cranny of the early Four Marks developments with the exception of the early bungalows on the southern side of Blackberry Lane; about twenty-three according to the 1912 map of Winchester College.

Within five years, the population of this small area to the south and east of the London to Winchester road had almost trebled to close to 250 people with over thirty new homes. Many new inhabitants, noted in later censuses, came from ‘London’: Battersea, Bloomsbury, Bow, Bowes Park, Camberwell, Chiswick, Ealing, Holborn, Hornsey, Islington, Kilburn, Kingston-upon-Thames, Leyton, Old Bailey, Paddington, St Pancras, Stamford Hill, Tooting, Tottenham, Tower Hamlets, Walworth, Westminster
and Windsor.

Four Marks had no beating heart. The most needed infrastructure was built by its new inhabitants before the war. The school was largely a gift of two benefactors. Marianna Hagen of Ropley was the driving force. She bought the plot of land, part of Homestead Farm on Hawthorn Road, in 1902 from J Tomlinson, a farmer. Tomlinson, in turn, gave the purchase price towards the cost of construction. At first, church services were held in the school. In 1908, Miss Hagen moved the ‘Iron Room’, a corrugated iron and timber hut from Ropley Soke to opposite Belford House where it became the mission. Around 1910, a social and multi-purpose Institute was formed which met in borrowed premises. A permanent building arrived in 1913 and this has since been incorporated into today’s Village Hall in Lymington Bottom.

A separate development, which began slowly shortly after the turn of the century, was an entirely different example of social change. The invention of
two new popular forms of transport, bicycles and motor vehicles, transformed Winchester Road along its length. This single-carriageway was eventually dotted with flowering cherry and ornamental apple trees. In a steady growth from between the wars and into the 1950s, businesses catered for a ‘mobile, fine evening and weekend pleasure pursuing population’ heading for the country. Premises ‘sprouted like mushrooms’ providing fuel and mechanical assistance for motorists and cyclists and, with the townies who came by railway, for sustenance with general stores, road houses, wholesome refreshment rooms, small shops, cafés, the Windmill Inn and, even, The Blinking Owl, a good class restaurant with a
dance floor. Those smaller shops, which might otherwise have spread around the side streets with the bungalows, instead congregated prominently on Winchester Road taking best advantage of the needs of both visitors and locals. Many of the shops were made of rickety ex-Canadian Army huts.

In its current and ongoing phase from 1961, the population of Four Marks more than tripled in the next fifty years, the number of dwellings quadrupling. There were 3,893 inhabitants in 2011. There has been an explosion in piecemeal and large estate development in the last ten years.

Crimean myth
Claims have been made in Wikipedia based on a local history that Four Marks was initially settled by returning soldiers of the Crimean War, 1853–56. The idea that a grateful government would give out land it did not own for a tiny selection of ordinary veterans uniquely in Four Marks is dubious. No supporting evidence has been found in government papers or in histories of the Crimean War. In the ten years to 1871, the population in Four Marks increased unremarkably to 139. If the small increase had been the result of the war, it would have happened before 1861 and not ten years later. A close examination of the occupants in 1861 shows no war-weary from Sevastopol, but a less exciting handful of fertile local families who worked the land on scattered existing farms: leaseholders, agricultural labourers, carters and a shepherd. The attractive Crimean story is a myth.

Local amenities

The village has a large recreation ground including football, cricket, tennis courts, local bowls club and BMX ramps. The village Centre has been recently refurbished, and includes a restful area surrounded by flowerbeds under the village clock. The local amenities include a chemist, a bakers with cafe, a fish and chip shop, a Chinese takeaway, an Indian restaurant, an off licence, a fine wine shop, both female and male hairdressers, Tesco and Co-op outlets, a filling station and limited free parking. The Co-op also houses the post office. The Primary School (Four Marks Primary School), is a Church of England school bearing the highest possible rank of "Outstanding" by OFSTED. There are two residential homes, a doctor's surgery, a veterinary surgery and a golf course. The village has a historic railway station forming part of the Watercress Line.

Four Marks is situated in some of the finest unspoilt Hampshire countryside. It is about half way along the historic St. Swithun's Way passing through the south-western fringe of the village, which links the South Downs Way at Winchester, the capital of Saxon England; to the North Downs Way at Farnham.

Local interest
The line was opened in 1865 joining Alton to Winchester. The railway company twice investigated tunnels to cut through the Four Marks ridge, but these plans were discarded because of cost. The solution was to cut a great gouge through the top of the hill at the bridge in Boyneswood Road. Medstead station was opened in 1868 with its name changing in 1937 to Medstead and Four Marks. The line provided an alternative route between London and Southampton and, besides transporting locally produced watercress, was particularly important for military traffic between the army town of Aldershot and the military embarkation port at Southampton. The line was axed in 1973 and bought by a local preservation society two years later .

Four Marks is the home of a small brewery with its own bar Triple fff Brewery whose beer can be found in pubs in the region.

Blackberry Lane was host to an important twin-dome observatory built in 1913 by James Worthington, precocious, ‘filthy rich’ and the epitome of a new-style of aggressive amateur astronomer. Worthington agreed with Percival Lovell, the owner of the now revered Lowell Observatory in Flagstaff, Arizona, that there were canals on Mars built by intelligent beings. The observatory was sold in 1919 when the theory was disproved to great embarrassment and pulled down about 1939. The circular ground works of the buildings can be found in the back garden of the original home now called 'Observatory'.

Telegraph Farm in Telegraph Lane was once part of an unfinished chain of semaphore stations intended to link The Admiralty in London to Plymouth to combat the threat of a French invasion. It was built in 1826 between River Hill House in Binsted and Merryfield in West Tisted. The semaphore was never used in anger and the station was made redundant in 1847. The semaphore technology was eventually replaced by a telegraph wire along the track of the railway from Alton to Alresford.

The Honourable Mrs Mildred Bruce was a British racing motorist and aviator, the first woman to fly around the world solo over land. Bruce
used to land her wooden, single-seat aerobatic biplane, the only Miles Satyr ever built, in the field across the road from her home at Pooks Hill in Alton Lane. She was visited here, at least once, by Amy Johnson, the first woman to fly solo to Australia. Johnson and other aviator visitors all landed in the same field.

Literary associations
A surprising number of authors and others with literary associations wrote in Four Marks. Here is a current list of books known to have been written in the village:

David Cornick, "Early Memories of Four Marks"

C. V. Durell, world best selling author of books on mathematics including "School Certificate Algebra" (1958)

Chris Heal, "Sound of Hunger" (2018), "Disappearing" (2019), "Reappearing" (2020), "The Four Marks Murders" (2020), "Ropley's Legacy" (2021) 

Jessie Louisa Rickard, "Murder by Night" (1939) among some forty light comedy and detective novels

W. C. H. Hudson, "Myself When Young, Memoirs of a Tea Planter" (2001)

Betty Mills, "Four Marks, its Life and Origins" (1995)

Denis Rolleston Gwynn, "The Vatican and the War in Europe" (1940) among dozens of books on Irish political figures

John De Walton, illustrator of many books like children's author Percy F. Westerman’s "The Flying Submarine" (1912)

Gerald Wyeth, "Four Marks School Boy’s Memories"

Media
The local newspapers are the Alton Herald and the Hampshire Chronicle. Both are published weekly. The Alton Herald regularly features articles about Four Marks.

The village has a volunteer-produced monthly magazine, the Four Marks News.

The Breeze (radio network) is the local Radio station on 101.6FM with a transmitter based in Four Marks, the service is relayed from the Southampton area.

BBC South is the local BBC service and ITV Meridian is the local ITV service. The BBC Local Radio service for the area is BBC Solent. All services are broadcasting from the Southampton area.

References

Further reading
Cornick, David, Early Memories of Four Marks (No publisher, undated).

Heal, Chris, The Four Marks Murders,  (Chattaway and Spottiswood, 2020, 2nd edition 2021).

Heal, Chris, Ropley's Legacy,  (Chattaway and Spottiswood, 2021).

Holmes, T.W., The Semaphore, The Story of the Admiralty-to-Portsmouth Shutter Telegraph and Semaphore Lines 1796 to 1847 (Stockwell 1983).

Mills, Betty, Four Marks: Its Life and Origins, 1995, .

Scotland, Campbell E., Exploring Four Marks and the surrounding Countryside (Four Marks News, second edition 2013).

Wyeth, Gerald, Four Marks School Boy’s Memories (No publisher, undated).

External links

 Google Maps Aerial Photograph
 Four Marks Primary School
 Local Radio
 Alton Herald
 Local Brewery

Villages in Hampshire
Quadripoints and higher